Anders Karlsson (born August 5, 1957) is a Swedish former professional ice hockey defenceman. Between 1979 and 1981, Karlsson played in the Swedish Elitserien with HV71 and Södertälje SK.

References

External links

1957 births
Living people
HV71 players
Södertälje SK players
Swedish ice hockey defencemen